Peter Montgomery Duplock, OBE (1916–2011) was an Anglican clergyman who served as Archdeacon of North West Europe from 1980 to 1981.

Duplock was educated at Queens' College, Cambridge and Ridley Hall, Cambridge. He was ordained deacon in 1940 and priest in 1941.  After a curacy in Morden he was a Chaplain to the Forces during World War II. He held incumbencies in Nottingham, Loddington and Kettering. He then served at Geneva, Brussels, Charleroi, Liège and Waterloo. He was the first Chancellor of Brussels Pro-Cathedral. His last post (1981 to 1986) was at Breamore.

He died on 16 September 2011.

References

1916 births
Alumni of Queens' College, Cambridge
Alumni of Ridley Hall, Cambridge
Archdeacons of North West Europe
2011 deaths
21st-century English Anglican priests
20th-century English Anglican priests
Royal Army Chaplains' Department officers
Officers of the Order of the British Empire